Bille Woodruff is a director of film, television and music videos, noted for directing many videos for a number of R&B and hip-hop artists since the mid-1990s. These artists include Joe, for whom Woodruff has directed 9 music videos since 1994, and Toni Braxton, with whom he has worked 10 times since 1996. Woodruff directed the videos for some of Braxton's biggest singles, including "Un-Break My Heart", "You're Makin' Me High", and "He Wasn't Man Enough".

Film and television career
Woodruff directed the 2003 film Honey. Rumors stated singer and actress Aaliyah was originally slated to play the title role, but died before filming began. However, Woodruff said, "That’s incorrect. It was supposed to be Beyoncé. That’s been widely reported but it’s incorrect. She couldn’t do it because of her touring schedule for her first album Dangerously in Love." She was replaced by Jessica Alba. The film was released on December 5, 2003 and opened at #2 at the US Box Office, earning $12,856,040 in its opening weekend. The film received generally negative reviews from critics, with a rating of 20% on Rotten Tomatoes, but favorable reviews from moviegoers, with a rating of 76% on Rotten Tomatoes.

Woodruff then directed the 2005 film Beauty Shop, a spin-off of the Barbershop film trilogy, starring Queen Latifah. The film was released on March 30, 2005 and went on to gross worldwide $37,245,453 at the worldwide box office. Movie critics' reviews were generally negative, generating a rating of 38% on Rotten Tomatoes. However, moviegoers liked the movie, giving it a 70% rating on Rotten Tomatoes.

He then directed the 2009 film Bring It On: Fight to the Finish, starring Christina Milian. The film was released straight-to-DVD on September 1, 2009.

He directed the straight-to-DVD sequel to Honey, Honey 2, which was released in 2011.

He released the movie Rags on Nickelodeon in 2012. He directed 7 episodes of The Game TV series in 2012 and 2013.

Woodruff directed the film adaptation of the best-selling novel of the same name Addicted and A Very Larry Christmas.

In 2015, Woodruff directed Honey 3 in South Africa with new fresh Talent including Bobby Lockwood and 'Kenny Wormald.

He directed the film The Perfect Match starring Terence Jenkins and Paula Patton in 2016.

Since 2016, he has directed numerous episodes of the following television series: Hit the Floor, Star, Empire and Black Lightning.

Videography

1991
Sounds of Blackness – "Optimistic"
The S.O.S. Band – "Sometimes I Wonder"

1994
Born Jamericans – "Boom Shak-a-tak"
Joe – "The One for Me"

1996
Joi – "Ghetto Superstar"
Tony Rich Project – "Nobody Knows"
Toni Braxton – "You're Makin' Me High"
Tony Rich Project – "Like a Woman"
Backstreet Boys – "I'll Never Break Your Heart" (version 2: USA)
Tony Rich Project – "Leavin'"
Toni Braxton – "Un-Break My Heart"
Gloria Estefan – "I'm Not Giving You Up"
T-Boz feat. Richie Rich – "Touch Myself"
Luther Vandross – "I Can Make It Better"
Dru Hill – "In My Bed" (version 1)
Puff Johnson – "All Over Your Face"
Tevin Campbell – "Back To The World"

1997
Backstreet Boys – "Nunca Te Haré Llorar"
OutKast – "Jazzy Belle"
Toni Braxton – "I Don't Want To"
Ginuwine – "I'll Do Anything"/"I'm Sorry"
Timbaland & Magoo feat. Missy Elliott & Aaliyah – "Up Jumps Da' Boogie"
Usher – "You Make Me Wanna"
Salt-N-Pepa – "R U Ready?"
Celine Dion – "My Heart Will Go On"
Jody Watley – "Off the Hook"

1998
Babyface & Des'ree – "Fire"
Gloria Estefan – "Heaven's What I Feel"/"Corazon Prohibido"
Joe – "All That I Am"
Celine Dion & R. Kelly – "I'm Your Angel"
Next – "Too Close"
Rebbie Jackson – "Yours Faithfully"
Tony Rich Project – "Silly Man"

1999
Foxy Brown feat. Total – "I Can't"
Celine Dion – "Then You Look at Me"
Dru Hill – "These Are The Times"
Honeyz – "Love of a Lifetime"
702 – "Where My Girls At?"
R. Kelly feat. Nas – "Did You Ever Think" (remix)
Kelly Price feat. Jermaine Dupri – "Secret Love"
702 – "You Don't Know"
Blaque – "I Do"
Jessica Simpson – "I Wanna Love You Forever"
Blaque – "Bring It All to Me"
Britney Spears – "Born to Make You Happy"
Marc Nelson – "15 Minutes"
Mint Condition – "If You Love Me"
Trisha Yearwood – "You're Where I Belong"
Joy Enriquez – "How Can I Not Love You"

2000
Celine Dion – "Live (For the One I Love)"
TLC – "Dear Lie"
Joe – "I Wanna Know"
Toni Braxton – "He Wasn't Man Enough"
Mary J. Blige – "Your Child"
Toni Braxton feat. Dr. Dre – "Just Be A Man About It"
Joe – "Treat Her Like a Lady"
Kelly Price – "You Should've Told Me"
Toni Braxton – "Spanish Guitar"
98 Degrees – "My Everything"
Ruff Endz – "No More"
Chanté Moore – "Straight Up"

2001
Lucy Pearl feat. Snoop Dogg and Q-Tip – "You"
Ray J feat. Lil' Kim – "Wait a Minute"
Mary Mary feat. Kirk Franklin – "Thank You"
Blu Cantrell – "I'll Find a Way"
Fat Joe feat. R. Kelly – "We Thuggin'"
Babyface – "What If"
R. Kelly – "The World's Greatest"
Britney Spears – "Overprotected" (original version)
R. Kelly – "The Storm Is Over Now"
The Isley Brothers feat. R. Kelly and Chanté Moore – "Contagious"
R. Kelly – "Feelin' on Yo Booty"
Remy Shand – "Take a Message"

2002
Fat Joe feat. Ashanti – "What's Luv?"
Joe – "What If a Woman"
Nelly – "Hot in Herre" (version 1)
Christina Milian – "When You Look at Me"
Kirk Franklin – "Brighter Day"
Joe – "Let's Stay Home Tonight"
Laura Pausini – "Surrender" (version 1)

2003
Nick Lachey – "Shut Up"
R. Kelly – "Ignition (Remix)"
The Isley Brothers feat. JS – "Busted"
The Isley Brothers feat. R. Kelly – "What Would You Do?"

2005
B5 – "All I Do"
Britney Spears – "Do Somethin'"
R. Kelly feat. Wisin & Yandel – "Burn It Up"
Artists for Hurricane Relief – "Come Together Now"
Sharissa feat. R. Kelly – "In Love with a Thug"

2006
The Isley Brothers – "Just Came Here to Chill"
Joe feat. Papoose – "Where You At"
3LW feat. Jermaine Dupri – "Feelin' You"
Mary J. Blige – "Take Me as I Am"

2007
Paula DeAnda feat. Bow Wow – "Easy"

2008
Trina – "Single Again"
Enrique Iglesias feat. Lil Wayne – "Push"
Joe – "Why Just Be Friends"

2009
Miranda Cosgrove – "About You Now"
Toni Braxton – "Yesterday"

2010
Dru Hill – "Love MD"
Toni Braxton – "Make My Heart"
Toni Braxton – "Hands Tied"
Cymia – "Kid Nation"
Chris Willis – "Louder"
Shayne Ward – "Gotta Be Somebody"

2011
Jay Sean featuring Lil Wayne – "Hit the Lights"
Kat Graham – "Love Will Never Do Without an Escapade (Janet Mashup)"

2012
Toni Braxton – "I Heart You"

2014
Joe feat. Kelly Rowland – "Love & Sex, Pt. 2"

2017
Toni Braxton – "Deadwood"

Filmography

Film
Honey (2003)
Beauty Shop (2005)
Bring It On: Fight to the Finish (2009)
Honey 2 (2011)
Rags (2012)
Addicted (2014)
Drumline: A New Beat (2014)
The Perfect Match (2016)
Honey 3: Dare to Dance (2016)

Television

References

Further reading
 Henry Keazor, Thorsten Wübbena: Video Thrills The Radio Star. Musikvideos: Geschichte, Themen, Analysen. Bielefeld 2005, p. 111ss.

External links

Bille Woodruff on VidDug – List of Bille Woodruff's music video credits with links to videos

American music video directors
African-American film directors
Film directors from Colorado
Year of birth missing (living people)
Living people
21st-century African-American people